George Baird Affleck (May 22, 1874 – September 11, 1958) was an American football and basketball coach. He served as the head football coach at Iowa State Normal School—now known as the University of Northern Iowa—in 1901, compiling a record of 5–3–2. Affleck was also the head basketball coach at Iowa State Normal for one season, in 1901–02, tallying a mark of 1–2. He later served as a professor at the Springfield YMCA training school—now known as Springfield College—in Springfield, Massachusetts from 1908 to 1941.

Head coaching record

Football

References

1874 births
1958 deaths
Northern Iowa Panthers football coaches
Northern Iowa Panthers men's basketball coaches
Springfield College (Massachusetts) alumni
Springfield College (Massachusetts) faculty
People from Lanark County
Sportspeople from Ontario